The Gold Humanism Honor Society (GHHS) is a national honor society that honors senior medical students, residents, role-model physician teachers and other exemplars recognized for excellence in clinical care, leadership, compassion and dedication to service. It was created by the Arnold P. Gold Foundation for Humanism in Medicine.

History 
The Gold Humanism Honor Society was established in 2002 with generous sponsorship from the Robert Wood Johnson Foundation, The Berrie Foundation and an unknown donor. 

GHHS currently has more than 160 chapters in medical schools and internship programs.

Under the direction of faculty advisor, Dr. Amy Weil, the UNC Chapter of GHHS was created in 2013.

Membership 
Members are elected by their colleagues and staff, and a screening committee evaluates them on the grounds of their contribution to humanism, outstanding leadership abilities, sensitivity, honesty, good judgement and community service.

Purpose
The purpose of GHHS is to recognize the importance of humanistic care and to honor physicians who achieve this excellence.

Similar societies
Alpha Omega Alpha
Sigma Sigma Phi

References

External links

 Arnold P. Gold Foundation GHHS

Further reading
 Iserson, Kenneth V. (2003). Iserson's Getting Into a Residency (6th ed). Tucson: Galen Press.

Honor societies
Medical education in the United States